Canada Post has issued several definitive stamps series since the Dominion of Canada was formed in 1867 featuring both novel and recurring themes. See Postage stamps and postal history of Canada for an overview and for history prior to federation.

Details of stamp issues have been collected and published in various stamp catalogues and in recent decades Canada Post has been issuing regular bulletins.

Victorian period 
The new Canadian government issued a series of stamps on April 1, 1868 featuring a profile of Queen Victoria, superseding previous issues by the separate colonies. These are known as the "Large Queens" comprising the following stamps:

These were followed by the "Small Queens" in 1870.

These were followed by the "Maple Leaf" issue in 1897.

King Edward VII 
Upon the accession of King Edward VII, the Maple Leaf design framing a portrait of Edward was issued starting 1903.

King George V 
King George V was depicted in 1911 as Admiral of the Fleet in design that continued in use until 1928.

The "Scroll" issue of 1928 was the first bilingual stamp issue and also featured pictorial designs for the high values.

This was followed in 1930 by the "Arch" series which also included high value pictorials.

The "Medallion" series was issued from 1932.

The final King George V definitive series was issued in 1935.

King George VI 
There were three sets of definitives featuring King George VI, the first series starting in 1937.

This was followed by the "War Issue", starting in 1942.

The final King George VI definitives depicted the king in a much plainer design and were issued starting in 1949.

Queen Elizabeth II 
Upon her accession to the throne following the death of King George VI, a definitive series depicting Queen Elizabeth II was issued in 1953. The design for the issue was from a photograph supplied by Karsh, of Ottawa.  The stamps are engraved and printed by the Canadian Bank Note Company, Limited, Ottawa.

This was quickly followed by a series in 1954 featuring the Queen's Wilding portrait.

The next series of Canadian definitives starting in 1962 again featured the Queen.

The following series starting in 1967 featured the Queen and pictorials for the high values.

Post 1970 
The series starting from 1972 featured Canadian prime ministers for the low values, the Queen for the base rate and pictorials for the high values.

The next definitive series began in 1977. It featured Canadian flora, the Queen and parliament buildings for low values, larger flora designs for medium values, and street scenes and national parks for high values.

References 

Postage stamps of Canada